Alexander Priestly Camphor (1865–1919) was an American Missionary Bishop of the Methodist Episcopal Church, elected in 1916.

A native of Louisiana, Camphor was the son of former slaves.  He was an educator and a Missionary Bishop.  Camphor Hall at Dillard University, New Orleans is named in his honor.

August 9 1865: Alexander Camphor was born to slave parents on a Louisiana sugar plantation. When he was a young child, he was adopted by a white Methodist preacher, Stephen Priestly. Priestly sent Alexander to Methodist Freedman’s Aid schools during Reconstruction. He graduated from New Orleans University in 1887 and later taught mathematics there for four years while also organizing the Friends of Africa Society. After graduating from Gammon Theological Seminary in 1895, he completed postgraduate work at Columbia University and Union Theological Seminary in New York."

"Alexander married Mamie Anna Rebecca Camphor (née Wheathers or Weathers) in 1893. Mamie Camphor was born November 27, 1869, in Woodville, Mississippi. By all accounts, she was an educated woman and well-versed in terms of her vocabulary. She was Alexander’s active partner in missionary work, raising interest and support for their joint work.

In 1896, the Camphors were assigned to the Methodist Monrovia Seminary in Liberia. Within a year, they had reorganized the seminary, increased enrollment, and proposed an expanded organization and facility. Its charter included providing high school education. a degree-granting courses in ministry, and dormitory facilities for male and female students. The name was also changed to the College of West Africa Monrovia. Camphor served as its President from 1897 – 1907.

In May 1916, he was made Bishop of Africa by the General Methodist Episcopal Conference and served in this capacity until 1919 at which time the Camphors returned to the U.S. They intended to return to Liberia. However, Alexander became ill from pneumonia in October 1919 and died at his home in South Orange, New Jersey the following December. After the death of her husband, Mamie Camphor returned to Monrovia and resumed missionary work.

Bishop Camphor had several achievements during his lifetime. In addition to being the namesake of the church in Minnesota, there are three other United Methodist churches named in his honor, located in Baton Rouge, Philadelphia, and Monrovia, Liberia.

See also
 List of bishops of the United Methodist Church

External links
Camphor Memorial Church: Bishop Alexander Priestly Camphor
Photo of Bishop Camphor

Bishops of the Methodist Episcopal Church
American Methodist bishops
1865 births
1919 deaths
Methodist missionary bishops
20th-century Methodist bishops